Shehhi or Shehi may refer to:

 Shihhi Arabic, a variety of Arabic spoken in Oman
 al-Shehhi, an Arab tribe of the Arabian peninsula
 Orges Shehi (born 1977), Albanian footballer 
 Shehi, a panchayat village in Nandurbar District, Maharashtra, India

Albanian-language surnames